The 2012 Chicago Cubs season was the 141st season of the Chicago Cubs franchise, the 137th in the National League and the 97th at Wrigley Field. The Cubs finished fifth in the NL Central with a record of 61–101, their worst record since 1966. The Cubs began the season at home on April 5, 2012 against the Washington Nationals and finished the season at home on October 3 against the Houston Astros.

The season marked the first season with Jed Hoyer as General Manager and Theo Epstein as President of Baseball Operations. It also marked the first season with Dale Sveum as manager. The season also marked the last season with the Houston Astros in the National League Central as they would move to the American League West in 2013.

The season also marked the first season in the Cubs rebuilding project under Theo Epstein that would break their 108-year World Series drought and lead the Cubs to the 2016 World Series championship.

The season was the last full season with the Cubs for Alfonso Soriano, who would be traded at the 2013 trade deadline.

During the offseason, the Cubs would acquire future All-Star Anthony Rizzo from the San Diego Padres. During the season, the Cubs would also acquire players that would play important roles during their 2016 World Series season: Travis Wood was acquired via trade from the Cincinnati Reds on December 23, 2011, Albert Almora was drafted on June 4, Jorge Soler was signed as an amateur free agent on June 30, and Kyle Hendricks was acquired via a trade with the Texas Rangers on July 30.

Offseason transactions

November 2011 
 November 2, Justin Berg, Robert Coello, Angel Guzman, Scott Moore, Chris Robinson, and Jeff Stevens granted free agency.
 November 15, signed Justin Berg as a free agent.
 November 18, Luis Montanez granted free agency.
 November 30, signed David DeJesus as a free agent.

December 
 December 8, drafted Lendy Castillo from the Philadelphia Phillies in the 2011 rule 5 draft. Ryan Flaherty drafted by the Baltimore Orioles in the 2011 rule 5 draft. Marwin Gonzalez drafted by the Boston Red Sox in the 2011 rule 5 draft.
 December 8, traded Tyler Colvin and DJ LeMahieu to the Colorado Rockies. Received Casey Weathers (minors) and Ian Stewart.
 December 9, selected Jeff Bianchi off waivers from the Kansas City Royals.
 December 12, Koyie Hill granted free agency.
 December 21, signed Reed Johnson as a free agent.
 December 22, signed Manny Corpas as a free agent.
 December 23, traded Sean Marshall to the Cincinnati Reds. Received Dave Sappelt, Ronald Torreyes, and Travis Wood.
 December 26, signed Andy Sonnanstine as a free agent.

January 2012 
 January 4, signed Andy Sonnanstine as a free agent.
 January 5, traded Carlos Zambrano and cash to the Miami Marlins. Received Chris Volstad.
 January 6, signed Edgar Gonzalez as a free agent. Traded Kyung-Min Na (minors) and Andrew Cashner to the San Diego Padres. Received Zach Cates (minors) and Anthony Rizzo.
 January 10, signed Paul Maholm as a free agent.
 January 11, Jeff Bianchi selected by the Milwaukee Brewers off waivers.
 January 13, signed Alfredo Amezaga and Kerry Wood as a free agents.
 January 18, signed Jason Jaramillo as a free agent.
 January 19, signed Rodrigo Lopez as a free agent.
 January 20, signed Bobby Scales as a free agent.
 January 30, signed Trever Miller and Matt Tolbert as a free agents.

February 
 February 2, signed Ryan Rowland-Smith as a free agent.
 February 6, selected Adrian Cardenas off waivers from the Oakland Athletics.
 February 18, signed Nate Robertson as a free agent.
 February 21, traded a player to be named later and Chris Carpenter to the Boston Red Sox. Received a player to be named later. Sent Aaron Kurcz (minors) (March 15, 2012) to the Boston Red Sox to complete the trade. Received Jair Bogaerts (minors) (March 29, 2012)  to complete the trade.

March 
 March 11, signed Gerardo Concepcion as an amateur free agent
 March 16, selected Frankie De La Cruz off waivers from the Milwaukee Brewers.
 March 24, Andy Sonnanstine granted free agency.
 March 26, signed Shawn Camp as a free agent. Released Trever Miller.
 March 27, released Jason Jaramillo.
 March 31, released Bobby Scales.

April 
 April 4, selected Luis Valbuena off waivers from the Toronto Blue Jays.
Source

Regular season

NL Central standings

NL Wild Card

Record vs. opponents

Transactions

April  
 April 5, John Gaub selected by the Tampa Bay Rays off waivers.
 April 21, traded Marlon Byrd and cash to the Boston Red Sox. Received a player to be named later and Michael Bowden. The Boston Red Sox sent Hunter Cervenka (May 15, 2012) to complete the trade. 
 April 29, released Edgar Gonzalez.

May 
 May 12, signed Brian Esposito as a free agent.
 May 15, signed Mike MacDougal as a free agent.
 May 19, Kerry Wood voluntarily retired. Purchased Koyie Hill from the Cincinnati Reds.
 May 25, signed Diory Hernandez as a free agent. 
 May 29, signed Shane Lindsay as a free agent. Released Nate Robertson.

June 
 June 1, selected Jairo Asencio off waivers from the Cleveland Indians.
 June 4, signed Hung-Chih Kuo as a free agent. Drafted Albert Almora in the 1st round (6th pick) of the 2012 amateur draft. Player signed July 10, 2012.
 June 17, Koyie Hill granted free agency.
 June 27, released Shane Lindsay.
 June 30, signed Jorge Soler as an amateur free agent.

July 
 July 6, released Hung-Chih Kuo.
 July 12, purchased Justin Germano from the Boston Red Sox.
 July 27, signed Jeff Frazier as a free agent.
 July 30, traded Reed Johnson, Paul Maholm and cash to the Atlanta Braves. Received Jaye Chapman and Arodys Vizcaino.
 July 31, traded Geovany Soto to the Texas Rangers. Received Jake Brigham and player to be named or cash. Traded Ryan Dempster to the Texas Rangers. Received Christian Villanueva (minors) and Kyle Hendricks.

August 
 August 5, traded Jeff Baker to the Detroit Tigers. Received players to be named later. The Detroit Tigers sent Marcelo Carreno (minors) (October 16, 2012) and cash (October 16, 2012) to complete the trade.
 August 13, signed Seth McClung as a free agent.
 August 14, released Frankie De La Cruz.
 August 16, signed Horacio Ramirez as a free agent.
 August 19, selected Alex Hinshaw off waivers from the San Diego Padres.
 August 23, selected Miguel Socolovich off waivers from the Baltimore Orioles.
 August 27, traded Blake Lalli to the Oakland Athletics. Received Anthony Recker.
 August 29, Scott Maine selected by the Cleveland Indians off waivers.

September 
 September 7, selected Jason Berken off waivers from the Baltimore Orioles.

October 
 October 4, Blake DeWitt, Alex Hinshaw, and Randy Wells granted free agency.
 October 25, Anthony Recker selected by the New York Mets off waivers.
 October 26, Manny Corpas granted free agency. Chris Volstad selected by the Kansas City Royals off waivers.
 October 27, signed Edwin Maysonet as a free agent.
 October 29, Alfredo Amezaga, Shawn Camp, and Justin Germano granted free agency.
 October 31, Joe Mather granted free agency.
Source.

Game log 

|-style="background:#fbb"
| 1 || April 5 || Nationals || 1–2 || Clippard (1–0) || Mármol (0–1) || Lidge (1) || 41,176 || 0–1 ||L1
|-style="background:#fbb"
| 2 || April 7 || Nationals || 4–7 || Mattheus (1–0) || Wood (0–1) || Rodriguez (1) || 40,102 || 0–2 ||L2
|-style="background:#cfc"
| 3 || April 8 || Nationals || 4–3 || Samardzija (1–0) || Zimmermann (0–1) || Mármol (1) || 31,973 || 1–2 ||W1
|-style="background:#fbb"
| 4 || April 9 || Brewers || 5–7 || Marcum (1–0) || Camp (0–1) || Axford (1) || 38,136 || 1–3 ||L1
|-style="background:#fbb"
| 5 || April 10 || Brewers || 4–7 || Narveson (1–0) || Maholm (0–1) || Rodriguez (1) || 37,265 || 1–4 ||L2
|-style="background:#fbb"
| 6 || April 11 || Brewers || 1–2 || Gallardo (1–1) || Dempster (0–1) || Axford (2) || 34,044 || 1–5 ||L3
|-style="background:#cfc"
| 7 || April 12 || Brewers || 8–0 || Garza (1–0) || Greinke (1–1) ||—
| 36,311 || 2–5 ||W1
|-style="background:#cfc"
| 8 || April 13 || @ Cardinals || 9–5 || Samardzija (2–0) || Wainwright (0–2) ||—
| 46,882 || 3–5 ||W2
|-style="background:#fbb"
| 9 || April 14 || @ Cardinals || 1–5 || Lynn (2–0) || Volstad (0–1) ||—
| 46,792 || 3–6 ||L1
|-style="background:#fbb"
| 10 || April 15 || @ Cardinals || 3–10 || Westbrook (2–0) || Maholm (0–2) ||—
| 44,952 || 3–7 ||L2
|-style="background:#fbb"
| 11 || April 17 || @ Marlins || 2–5 || Cishek (1–0) || Dolis (0–1) || Bell (1) || 24,544 || 3–8 ||L3
|-style="background:#fbb"
| 12 || April 18 || @ Marlins || 1–9 || Buehrle (1–2) || Garza (1–1) || || 25,723 || 3–9 ||L4
|-style="background:#fbb"
| 13 || April 19 || @ Marlins || 3–5 || Nolasco (2–0) || Samardzija (2–1) || Bell (2) || 23,168 || 3–10 ||L5
|-style="background:#fbb"
| 14 || April 20 || Reds || 4–9 || Bailey (1–2) || Volstad (0–2) ||—
| 37,782 || 3–11 ||L6
|-style="background:#cfc"
| 15 || April 21 || Reds || 6–1 || Maholm (1–2) || Leake (0–2) ||—
| 38,405 || 4–11 ||W1
|-style="background:#fbb"
| 16 || April 22 || Reds || 3–4 || Cueto (2–0) || López (0–1) || Marshall (3) || 35,801 || 4–12 ||L1
|-style="background:#cfc"
| 17 || April 23 || Cardinals || 3–2 || Dolis (1–1) || Motte (1–1) ||—
| 37,794 || 5–12 ||W1
|-style="background:#cfc"
| 18 || April 24 || Cardinals || 3–2 (10) || Russell (1–0) || Salas (0–1) ||—
| 38,894 || 6–12 ||W2
|-style="background:#fbb"
| 19 || April 25 || Cardinals || 1–5 || Lynn (4–0) || Volstad (0–3) ||—
| 34,894 || 6–13 ||L1
|-style="background:#cfc"
| 20 || April 27 || @ Phillies || 5–1 || Maholm (2–2) || Halladay (3–2) || Dolis (1) || 45,261 || 7–13 ||W1
|-style="background:#fbb"
| 21 || April 28 || @ Phillies || 2–5 || Blanton (2–3) || Wells (0–1) || Papelbon (7) || 45,196 || 7–14 ||L1
|-style="background:#cfc"
| 22 || April 29 || @ Phillies || 5–1 || Garza (2–1) || Kendrick (0–2) ||—
| 45,550 || 8–14 ||W1
|-style="background:#fbb"
| 23 || April 30 || @ Phillies || 4–6 || Qualls (1–0) || Maine (0–1) || Papelbon (8) || 45,397 || 8–15 ||L1
|-

|-style="background:#bbb"
| -- || May 1 || @ Reds||colspan=7| Postponed (rain). Makeup Date August 18. 
|-style="background:#cfc"
| 24 || May 2 || @ Reds || 3–1 || Samardzija (3–1) || Arroyo (1–1) || Mármol (2) || 18,868 || 9–15 ||W1
|-style="background:#fbb"
| 25 || May 3 || @ Reds || 3–4 (10) || Ondrusek (2–0) || Dolis (1–2) ||—
| 23,288 || 9–16 ||L1
|-style="background:#cfc"
| 26 || May 4 || Dodgers || 5–4 || Maholm (3–2) || Billingsley (2–2) || Dolis (2) || 37,332 || 10–16 ||W1
|-style="background:#fbb"
| 27 || May 5 || Dodgers || 1–5 || Capuano (4–0) || Volstad (0–4) ||—
| 39,874 || 10–17 ||L1
|-style="background:#cfc"
| 28 || May 6 || Dodgers || 4–3 (11) || Dolis (2–2) || Wright (1–2) ||—
| 38,125 || 11–17 ||W1
|-style="background:#cfc
| 29 || May 7 || Braves || 5–1 || Samardzija (4–1) || Hanson (3–3) ||—
| 36,307 || 12–17 ||W2
|-style="background:#fbb"
| 30 || May 8 || Braves || 1–3 || Medlen (1–0) || Wood (0–2) || Kimbrel (10) || 38,523 || 12–18 ||L1
|-style="background:#cfc"
| 31 || May 9 || Braves || 1–0 || Maholm (4–2) || Hudson (1–1) || Dolis (3) || 31,904 || 13–18 ||W1
|-style="background:#fbb"
| 32 || May 11 || @ Brewers || 7–8 (13) || Chulk (1–0) || Castillo (0–1) ||—
| 40,097 || 13–19 ||L1
|-style="background:#fbb"
| 33 || May 12 || @ Brewers || 2–8 || Marcum (2–1) || Volstad (0–5) ||—
| 42,339 || 13–20 ||L2
|-style="background:#cfc"
| 34 || May 13 || @ Brewers || 8–2 || Camp (1–1) || Loe (2–1) ||—
| 42,167 || 14–20 ||W1
|-style="background:#cfc"
| 35 || May 14 || @ Cardinals || 6–4 || Camp (2–1) || Boggs (0–1) || Dolis (4) || 44,276 || 15–20 ||W2
|-style="background:#fbb"
| 36 || May 15 || @ Cardinals || 6–7 || Motte (2–1) || Dolis (2–3) ||—
| 45,538 || 15–21 ||L1
|-style="background:#fbb"
| 37 || May 16 || Phillies || 2–9 || Contreras (1–0) || Camp (2–2) ||—
| 38,678 || 15–22 ||L2
|-style="background:#fbb"
| 38 || May 17 || Phillies || 7–8 || Halladay (4–3) || Volstad (0–6) || Papelbon (11) || 37,986 || 15–23 ||L3
|-style="background:#fbb"
| 39 || May 18 || White Sox || 2–3 || Thornton (2–3) || Samardzija (4–2) || Reed (4) || 34,937 || 15–24 ||L4
|-style="background:#fbb"
| 40 || May 19 || White Sox || 4–7 || Danks (3–4) || Dempster (0–2) ||—
| 40,228 || 15–25 ||L5
|-style="background:#fbb"
| 41 || May 20 || White Sox || 0–6 || Peavy (5–1) || Maholm (4–3) ||—
| 38,374 || 15–26 ||L6
|-style="background:#fbb"
| 42 || May 21 || @ Astros || 4–8 || Norris (5–1) || Garza (2–2) ||—
| 16,895 || 15–27 ||L7
|-style="background:#fbb"
| 43 || May 22 || @ Astros || 1–2 || Happ (4–3) || Wood (0–1) || Myers (11) || 20,091 || 15–28 ||L8
|-style="background:#fbb"
| 44 || May 23 || @ Astros || 1–5 || Rodríguez (4–4) || Samardzija (4–3) ||—
| 18,732 || 15–29 ||L9
|-style="background:#fbb"
| 45 || May 25 || @ Pirates || 0–1 || Burnett (3–2) || Dempster (0–3) || Hanrahan (11) || 29,914 || 15–30 ||L10
|-style="background:#fbb"
| 46 || May 26 || @ Pirates || 2–3 || Hanrahan (2–0) || Dolis (2–4) ||—
| 38,132 || 15–31 ||L11
|-style="background:#fbb"
| 47 || May 27 || @ Pirates || 4–10 || Bédard (3–5) || Garza (2–3) ||—
| 27,486 || 15–32 ||L12
|-style="background:#cfc"
| 48 || May 28 || Padres || 11–7 || Wells (1–1) || Hinshaw (0–1) ||—
| 38,452 || 16–32 ||W1
|-style="background:#cfc"
| 49 || May 29 || Padres || 5–3 || Samardzija (5–3) || Stults (1–1) || Russell (1) || 35,219 || 17–32 ||W2
|-style="background:#cfc"
| 50 || May 30 || Padres || 8–6 || Russell (2–0) || Thayer (0–1) ||—
| 38,516 || 18–32 ||W3
|-

|-style="background:#fbb"
| 51 || June 1 || @ Giants || 3–4 || Bumgarner (6–4) || Maholm (4–4) || López (1) || 41,100 || 18–33 ||L1
|-style="background:#fbb"
| 52 || June 2 || @ Giants || 1–2 || Cain (6–2) || Garza (2–4) || Romo (1) || 41,239 || 18–34 ||L2
|-style="background:#fbb"
| 53 || June 3 || @ Giants || 0–2 || Zito (5–2) || Wood (0–2) || Romo (2) || 41,112 || 18–35 ||L3
|-style="background:#fbb"
| 54 || June 4 || @ Giants || 2–3 || Vogelsong (4–2) || Mármol (0–2) || Affeldt (1) || 41,524 || 18–36 ||L4
|-style="background:#cfc"
| 55 || June 5 || @ Brewers || 10–0 || Dempster (1–3) || Gallardo (4–5) ||—
| 28,071 || 19–36 ||W1
|-style="background:#fbb
| 56 || June 6 || @ Brewers || 0–8 || Greinke (7–2) || Maholm (4–5) ||—
| 27,112 || 19–37 ||L1
|-style="background:#fbb"
| 57 || June 7 || @ Brewers || 3–4 (10) || Axford (1–2) || Coleman (0–1) ||—
| 30,123 || 19–38 ||L2
|-style="background:#fbb"
| 58 || June 8 || @ Twins || 7–8 (10) || Capps (1–3) || Camp (2–3) ||—
| 38,014 || 19–39 ||L3
|-style="background:#fbb"
| 59 || June 9 || @ Twins || 3–11 || Diamond (5–1) || Samardzija (5–4) ||—
| 39,309 || 19–40 ||L4
|-style="background:#cfc"
| 60 || June 10 || @ Twins || 8–2 || Dempster (2–3) || Liriano (1–7) ||—
| 37,526 || 20–40 ||W1
|-style="background:#cfc"
| 61 || June 12 || Tigers || 4–3 || Mármol (1–2) || Coke (1–3) || Camp (1) || 41,164 || 21–40 ||W2
|-style="background:#fbb"
| 62 || June 13 || Tigers || 4–8 || Porcello (4–4) || Garza (2–5) ||—
| 41,326 || 21–41 ||L1
|-style="background:#fbb"
| 63 || June 14 || Tigers || 3–5 || Verlander (6–4) || Wood (0–3) || Valverde (13) || 42,292 || 21–42 ||L2
|-style="background:#cfc"
| 64 || June 15 || Red Sox || 3–0 || Dempster (3–3) || Matsuzaka (0–2) || Mármol (3) || 40,073 || 22–42 ||W1
|-style="background:#fbb"
| 65 || June 16 || Red Sox || 3–4 || Lester (4–4) || Samardzija (5–5) || Aceves (16) || 40,766 || 22–43 ||L1
|-style="background:#fbb"
| 66 || June 17 || Red Sox || 4–7 || Albers (2–0) || Camp (2–4) ||—
| 38,531 || 22–44 ||L2
|-style="background:#cfc"
| 67 || June 18 || @ White Sox || 12–3 || Garza (3–5) || Stewart (1–2) ||—
| 33,215 || 23–44 ||W1
|-style="background:#cfc"
| 68 || June 19 || @ White Sox || 2–1 || Wood (1–3) || Peavy (6–3) || Mármol (4) || 30,282 || 24–44 ||W2
|-style="background:#fbb"
| 69 || June 20 || @ White Sox || 0–7 || Floyd (5–7) || Wells (1–2) ||—
| 32,311 || 24–45 ||L1
|-style="background:#fbb"
| 70 || June 22 || @ D-backs || 1–6 || Ziegler (4–1) || Samardzija (5–6) || Hernandez (2) || 34,654 || 24–46 ||L2
|-style="background:#fbb"
| 71 || June 23 || @ D-backs || 5–10 || Breslow (2–0) || Maholm (4–6) ||—
| 38,542 || 24–47 ||L3
|-style="background:#fbb"
| 72 || June 24 || @ D-backs || 1–5 || Miley (9–3) || Garza (3–6) ||—
| 33,448 || 24–48 ||L4
|-style="background:#cfc"
| 73 || June 25 || Mets || 6–1 || Wood (2–3) || Santana (5–4) ||—
| 34,092 || 25–48 ||W1
|-style="background:#cfc"
| 74 || June 26 || Mets || 5–3 || Maine (1–1) || Gee (5–6) || Mármol (5) || 34,064 || 26–48 ||W2
|-style="background:#fbb"
| 75 || June 27 || Mets || 1–17 || Niese (6–3) || Samardzija (5–7) ||—
| 35,837 || 26–49 ||L1
|-style="background:#cfc"
| 76 || June 29 || Astros || 4–0 || Maholm (5–6) || Norris (5–5) || Mármol (6) || 32,891 || 27–49 ||W1
|-style="background:#cfc"
| 77 || June 30 || Astros || 3–2 || Garza (4–6) || Happ (6–8) || Mármol (7) || 37,906 || 28–49 ||W2
|-

|-style="background:#cfc"
| 78 || July 1 || Astros || 3–0 || Wood (3–3) || Rodríguez (6–6) || Mármol (8) || 37,389 || 29–49 ||W3
|-style="background:#cfc"
| 79 || July 2 || @ Braves || 4–1 || Samardzija (6–7) || Hanson (9–5) || Russell (2) || 22,292 || 30–49 ||W4
|-style="background:#fbb"
| 80 || July 3 || @ Braves || 3–10 || Jurrjens (2–2) || Volstad (0–7) ||—
| 27,834 || 30–50 ||L1
|-style="background:#cfc"
| 81 || July 4 || @ Braves || 5–1 || Maholm (6–6) || Delgado (4–9) ||—
| 40,604 || 31–50 ||W1
|-style="background:#fbb"
| 82 || July 5 || @ Braves || 3–7 || Minor (5–6) || Garza (4–7) ||—
| 24,408 || 31–51 ||L1
|-style="background:#cfc"
| 83 || July 6 || @ Mets || 8–7 || Wood (4–3) || Santana (6–5) ||—
| 27,956 || 32–51 ||W1
|-style="background:#fbb"
| 84 || July 7 || @ Mets || 1–3 || Gee (6–7) || Samardzija (6–8) || Parnell (2) || 26,096 || 32–52 ||L1
|-style="background:#cfc"
| 85 || July 8 || @ Mets || 7–0 || Dempster (4–3) || Niese (7–4) ||—
| 25,920 || 33–52 ||W1
|-style="text-align:center; background:#bbcaff;"
|colspan="10"|83rd All-Star Game in Kansas City, Missouri
|-style="background:#cfc"
| 86 || July 13 || D-backs || 8–1 || Maholm (7–6) || Kennedy (6–8) ||—
| 36,878 || 34–52 ||W2
|-style="background:#cfc"
| 87 || July 14 || D-backs || 4–1 || Dempster (5–3) || Saunders (4–6) || Mármol (9) || 38,068 || 35–52 ||W3
|-style="background:#cfc"
| 88 || July 15 || D-backs || 3–1 || Garza (5–7) || Cahill (7–8) || Mármol (10) || 36,659 || 36–52 ||W4
|-style="background:#fbb"
| 89 || July 17 || Marlins || 5–9 || Sánchez (5–6) || Wood (4–4) ||—
| 34,397 || 36–53 ||L1
|-style="background:#cfc"
| 90 || July 18 || Marlins || 5–1 (8) || Russell (3–0) || Johnson (5–7) ||—
| 34,934 || 37–53 ||W1
|-style="background:#cfc"
| 91 || July 19 || Marlins || 4–2 || Maholm (8–6) || Buehrle (9–9) || Mármol (11) || 32,741 || 38–53 ||W2
|-style="background:#fbb"
| 92 || July 20 || @ Cardinals || 1–4 || Lohse (10–2) || Dempster (5–4) || Motte (21) || 43,786 || 38–54 ||L1
|-style="background:#fbb"
| 93 || July 21 || @ Cardinals || 0–12 || Westbrook (8–8) || Germano (0–1) ||—
| 43,424 || 38–55 ||L2
|-style="background:#fbb"
| 94 || July 22 || @ Cardinals || 0–7 || Lynn (12–4) || Wood (4–5) ||—
| 42,411 || 38–56 ||L3
|-style="background:#cfc"
| 95 || July 23 || @ Pirates || 2–0 || Samardzija (7–8) || Bédard (5–11) || Mármol (12) || 27,586 || 39–56 ||W1
|-style="background:#cfc"
| 96 || July 24 || @ Pirates || 5–1 || Maholm (9–6) || McDonald (10–4) ||—
| 32,497 || 40–56 ||W2
|-style="background:#fbb"
| 97 || July 25 || @ Pirates || 2–3 || Correia (8–6) || Dempster (5–5) || Hanrahan (29) || 33,935 || 40–57 ||L1
|-style="background:#fbb"
| 98 || July 27 || Cardinals || 6–9 || Lynn (13–4) || Wood (4–6) || Motte (23) || 40,778 || 40–58 ||L2
|-style="background:#cfc"
| 99 || July 28 || Cardinals || 3–2 || Russell (4–0) || Kelly (1–4) || Mármol (13) || 41,276 || 41–58 ||W1
|-style="background:#cfc"
| 100 || July 29 || Cardinals || 4–2 (10) || Russell (5–0) || Rosenthal (0–1) ||—
| 39,534 || 42–58 ||W2
|-style="background:#cfc"
| 101 || July 30 || Pirates || 14–4 || Germano (1–1) || Bédard (5–12) ||—
| 33,337 || 43–58 ||W3
|-style="background:#fbb"
| 102 || July 31 || Pirates || 0–5 || Burnett (13–3) || Coleman (0–2) ||—
| 33,158 || 43–59 ||L1
|-

|-style="background:#fbb"
| 103 || August 1 || Pirates || 4–8 || Karstens (4–2) || Wood (4–7) ||—
| 33,014 || 43–60 ||L2
|-style="background:#fbb"
| 104 || August 3 || @ Dodgers || 1–6 || Billingsley (7–9) || Samardzija (7–9) ||—
| 43,537 || 43–61 ||L3
|-style="background:#fbb"
| 105 || August 4 || @ Dodgers || 1–3 || Kershaw (9–6) || Volstad (0–8) || Jansen (21) || 46,588 || 43–62 ||L4
|-style="background:#fbb"
| 106 || August 5 || @ Dodgers || 6–7 || Jansen (5–3) || Camp (2–5) ||—
| 42,495 || 43–63 ||L5
|-style="background:#fbb"
| 107 || August 6 || @ Padres || 0–2 || Stults (2–2) || Wood (4–8) || Street (19) || 27,187 || 43–64 ||L6
|-style="background:#fbb"
| 108 || August 7 || @ Padres || 4–7 || Ohlendorf (4–2) || Raley (0–1) || Street (20) || 26,518 || 43–65 ||L7
|-style="background:#fbb"
| 109 || August 8 || @ Padres || 0–2 || Richard (9–11) || Samardzija (7–10) ||—
| 24,663 || 43–66 ||L8
|-style="background:#cfc"
| 110 || August 9 || Reds || 5–3 || Camp (3–5) || Marshall (4–4) || Mármol (14) || 33,397 || 44–66 ||W1
|-style="background:#fbb
| 111 || August 10 || Reds || 8–10 || Bailey (10–7) || Germano (1–2) || Chapman (26) || 36,891 || 44–67 ||L
|-style="background:#fbb"
| 112 || August 11 || Reds || 2–4 || Arroyo (8–7) || Russell (5–1) || Chapman (27) || 40,602 || 44–68 ||L
|-style="background:#fbb"
| 113 || August 12 || Reds || 0–3 || Cueto (15–6) || Raley (0–2) || Chapman (28) || 35,461 || 44–69 ||L
|-style="background:#cfc"
| 114 || August 13 || Astros || 7–1 || Samardzija (8–10) || Galarraga (0–3) ||—
| 31,452 || 45–69 ||W1
|-style="background:#fbb"
| 115 || August 14 || Astros || 1–10 || Harrell (10–8) || Volstad (0–9) ||—
| 33,376 || 45–70 ||L
|-style="background:#cfc"
| 116 || August 15 || Astros || 7–2 || Germano (2–2) || Norris (5–10) ||—
| 33,714 || 46–70 ||W1
|-style="background:#fbb"
| 117 || August 17 || @ Reds || 3–7 || Arroyo (9–7) || Wood (4–9) ||—
| 35,332 || 46–71 ||L
|-style="background:#fbb"
| 118 || August 18 || @ Reds || 3–5 || Cueto (16–6) || Samardzija (8–11) || Chapman (29) || 28,754 || 46–72 ||L
|-style="background:#cfc"
| 119 || August 18 || @ Reds || 9–7 || Raley (1–2) || Redmond (0–1) || Mármol (15) || 41,236 || 47–72 ||W1
|-style="background:#fbb"
| 120 || August 19 || @ Reds || 4–5 || Chapman (5–4) || Camp (3–6) ||—
| 41,615 || 47–73 ||L
|-style="background:#fbb"
| 121 || August 20 || @ Brewers || 5–9 || Rogers (1–1) || Germano (2–3) ||—
| 28,776 || 47–74 ||L
|-style="background:#fbb"
| 122 || August 21 || @ Brewers || 2–5 || Estrada (1–5) || Rusin (0–1) || Axford (19) || 29,179 || 47–75 ||L
|-style="background:#fbb"
| 123 || August 22 || @ Brewers || 2–3 || Gallardo (13–8) || Wood (4–10) || Axford (20) || 30,743 || 47–76 ||L
|-style="background:#cfc"
| 124 || August 24 || Rockies || 5–3 || Russell (6–1) || Belisle (3–5) || Mármol (16) || 31,255 || 48–76 ||W1
|-style="background:#fbb"
| 125 || August 25 || Rockies || 3–4 || Torres (3–1) || Corpas (0–1) || Betancourt (26) || 35,296 || 48–77 ||L1
|-style="background:#cfc"
| 126 || August 26 || Rockies || 5–0 (8)|| Volstad (1–9) || Chacín (1–4) || Camp (2) || 32,346 || 49–77 ||W1
|-style="background:#fbb"
| 127 || August 27 || Brewers || 4–15 || Estrada (2–5) || Germano (2–4) ||—
| 32,541 || 49–78 ||L1
|-style="background:#fbb
| 128 || August 28 || Brewers || 1–4 || Gallardo (14–8) || Wood (4–11) || Axford (21) || 30,017 || 49–79 ||L2
|-style="background:#fbb"
| 129 || August 29 || Brewers || 1–3 || Fiers (8–6) || Samardzija (8–12) || Axford (22) || 33,271 || 49–80 ||L3
|-style="background:#cfc"
| 130 || August 30 || Brewers || 12–11 || Mármol (2–2) || Rodríguez (2–7) ||—
| 28,859 || 50–80 ||W1
|-style="background:#cfc"
| 131 || August 31 || Giants || 6–4 || Volstad (2–9) || Bumgarner (14–9) || Mármol (17) || 32,476 || 51–80 ||W2
|-

|-style="background:#fbb"
| 132 || September 1 || Giants || 2–5 || Lincecum (8–14) || Germano (2–5) || Romo (9) || 32,477 || 51–81 ||L1
|-style="background:#fbb"
| 133 || September 2 || Giants || 5–7 || Casilla (6–5) || Mármol (2–3) || López (6) || 39,760 || 51–82 ||L2
|-style="background:#fbb"
| 134 || September 3 || @ Nationals || 1–2 || Detwiler (9–6) || Samardzija (8–13) || Clippard (30)  || 23,215 || 51–83 ||L3
|-style="background:#fbb"
| 135 || September 4 || @ Nationals || 5–11 || Jackson (9–9) || Rusin (0–2) ||—
| 17,648 || 51–84 ||L4
|-style="background:#fbb"
| 136 || September 5 || @ Nationals || 1–9 || Gonzalez (18–7) || Volstad (2–10) ||—
| 21,244 || 51–85 ||L5
|-style="background:#fbb"
| 137 || September 6 || @ Nationals || 2–9 || Zimmermann (10–8) || Germano (2–6) ||—
| 22,447 || 51–86 ||L6
|-style="background:#cfc"
| 138 || September 7 || @ Pirates || 12–2 || Wood (5–11) || Burnett (15–6) ||—
| 32,699 || 52–86 ||W1
|-style="background:#cfc"
| 139 || September 8 || @ Pirates || 4–3 || Samardzija (9–13) || Grilli (1–5) ||—
| 35,661 || 53–86 ||W2
|-style="background:#cfc"
| 140 || September 9 || @ Pirates || 4–2 || Russell (7–1) || Grilli (1–6) || Mármol (18) || 28,671 || 54–86 ||W3
|-style="background:#cfc"
| 141 || September 10 || @ Astros || 4–1 || Volstad (3–10) || Rodriguez (1–10) || Mármol (19) || 13,121 || 55–86 ||W4
|-style="background:#fbb"
| 142 || September 11 || @ Astros || 0–1 || Lyles (4–11) || Germano (2–7) || López (4) || 14,205 || 55–87 ||L1
|-style="background:#cfc"
| 143 || September 12 || @ Astros || 5–1 || Wood (6–11) || Abad (0–4) ||—
| 13,101 || 56–87 ||W1
|-style="background:#cfc"
| 144 || September 14 || Pirates || 7–4 || Rusin (1–2) || McDonald (12–8) || Mármol (20) || 26,946 || 57–87 ||W2
|-style="background:#fbb"
| 145 || September 15 || Pirates || 6–7 || Rodríguez (11–13) || Berken (0–1) || Hanrahan (35) || 32,774 || 57–88 ||L1
|-style="background:#cfc"
| 146 || September 16 || Pirates || 13–9 || Beliveau (1–0) || Hughes (2–2) ||—
| 33,559 || 58–88 ||W1
|-style="background:#fbb"
| 147 || September 17 || Pirates || 0–3 || Correia (11–9) || Wood (6–12) || Hanrahan (36) || 33,017 || 58–89 ||L
|-style="background:#fbb"
| 148 || September 18 || Reds || 1–3 || Bailey (12–9) || Germano (2–8) || Broxton (26) || 32,547 || 58–90 ||L
|-style="background:#fbb"
| 149 || September 19 || Reds || 5–6 (11) || Ondrusek (5–2) || Cabrera (0–1) || Broxton (27) || 31,001 || 58–91 ||L
|-style="background:#fbb"
| 150 || September 20 || Reds || 3–5 || Cueto (18–9) || Corpas (0–2) || Simón (1) || 25,891 || 58–92 ||L
|-style="background:#cfc"
| 151 || September 21 || Cardinals || 5–4 (11) || Cabrera (1–1) || Kelly (5–7) ||—
| 29,100 || 59–92 ||W1
|-style="background:#fbb"
| 152 || September 22 || Cardinals || 4–5 (10) || Boggs (4–1) || Chapman (0–1) || Motte (39) || 40,298 || 59–93 ||L1
|-style="background:#fbb"
| 153 || September 23 || Cardinals || 3–6 || Lohse (16–3) || Germano (2–9) || Motte (40) || 33,354 || 59–94 ||L2
|-style="background:#fbb"
| 154 || September 25 || @ Rockies || 5–10 (7) || Torres (5–3) || Rusin (1–3) ||—
| 26,660 || 59–95 ||L3
|-style="background:#fbb"
| 155 || September 26 || @ Rockies || 0–6 || Pomeranz (2–9) || Berken (0–2) ||—
| 27,057 || 59–96 ||L4
|-style="background:#fbb"
| 156 || September 27 || @ Rockies || 5–7 || Chacín (3–5) || Volstad (3–11) || Betancourt (31) || 30,288 || 59–97 ||L5
|-style="background:#fbb"
| 157 || September 28 || @ D-backs || 3–8 || Kennedy (15–11) || Wood (6–13) ||—
| 28,463 || 59–98 ||L6
|-style="background:#fbb"
| 158 || September 29 || @ D-backs || 2–8 || Cahill (13–12) || Germano (2–10) ||—
| 29,084 || 59–99 ||L7
|-style="background:#cfc"
| 159 || September 30 || @ D-backs || 7–2 || Rusin (2–3) || Shaw (1–6) ||—
| 35,535 || 60–99 ||W1
|-

|-style="background:#fbb"
| 160 || October 1 || Astros || 0–3 || Harrell (11–11) || Berken (0–3) || Wright (1) || 32,167 || 60–100 ||L1
|-style="background:#fbb"
| 161 || October 2 || Astros || 0–3 || Norris (7–13) || Volstad (3–12)  || López (10)|| 33,168 || 60–101 ||L2
|-style="background:#cfc"
| 162 || October 3 || Astros || 5–4 || Mármol (3–3) || Ambriz (1–1) ||—
| 27,606 || 61–101 ||W1
|-

|- style="text-align:center;"
| Legend:       = Win       = Loss       = PostponementBold = Cubs team member

Roster

Statistics

Batting 
Note: G = Games played; AB = At bats; R = Runs scored; H = Hits; 2B = Doubles; 3B = Triples; HR = Home runs; RBI = Runs batted in; Avg. = Batting average; SB = Stolen bases

Pitching 
Note: W = Wins; L = Losses; ERA = Earned run average; G = Games pitched; GS = Games started; SV = Saves; IP = Innings pitched; H = Hits allowed; R = Runs allowed; ER = Earned runs allowed; BB = Walks allowed; K = Strikeouts

Farm system

References

External links 
Chicago Cubs schedule for the 2012 season
 2012 Chicago Cubs season at ESPN
2012 Chicago Cubs season at Baseball Reference

Chicago Cubs
Chicago Cubs seasons
Chicago Cubs